General Sir Frederick Adam  (17 June 178117 August 1853) was a Scottish  major-general at the Battle of Waterloo, in command of the 3rd (Light) Brigade. He was the fourth son of William Adam of Blair Adam and his wife Eleanora, the daughter of Charles Elphinstone, 10th Lord Elphinstone. He was later a Lord High Commissioner of the Ionian Islands, who built Mon Repos, Corfu and other important landmarks in that Protectorate.

Military career
He was born at the family home of Blairadam House, just north of Kelty in Fife.

At the age of fourteen in 1795, Frederick Adam entered the British Army. He trained at the artillery school at the Royal Arsenal, Woolwich. In the same year, he was commissioned as a first lieutenant and in 1796 he was promoted to second lieutenant.

He took part in the campaigns in the Netherlands and Egypt under Sir Ralph Abercromby, he was promoted to the rank of major in 1803 and a lieutenant colonel in 1804. From 1806 to 1811 he was stationed on Sicily. Between 1812 and 1813 he was in Spain fighting in the Peninsular War, where he was severely wounded at Alicante. On 12 April 1813, while commanding the Light Brigade in John Murray's expeditionary force, Adam led a brilliant rearguard action against the corps of Marshal Louis-Gabriel Suchet at Biar. The following day, his 2/27th Foot battalion inflicted 350 casualties on Suchet's 121st Line Regiment during the Battle of Castalla. He was wounded again in an action at Ordal on 13 September 1813.

Waterloo

On 18 June 1815, Adam commanded the 3rd British Brigade in Henry Clinton's 2nd Division at the Battle of Waterloo. At the crisis of the battle, Adam's 1/52nd (Light) Foot performed a left-wheel to enfilade the flank of the French Imperial Guard's main attack while the British Guards engaged the head of the column. Under fire from two directions, the French guardsmen put up a brief resistance then fled. After their unsuccessful attack on the British centre, the Guard rallied to their reserves of three (some sources say four) regiments, just south of La Haye Sainte for a last stand against the British.  But a charge from Adam's brigade threw them into a state of confusion and those which were left retreated towards La Belle Alliance. It was during this stand that Colonel Hugh Halkett took the surrender of General Cambronne.

The French Imperial Guard made a last stand in squares on either side of the La Belle Alliance. General Adam's Brigade charged the square which was formed on rising ground to the (British) right of La Belle Alliance and again threw them into a state of confusion.  The other square was attacked by the Prussians. The French retreated away from the battlefield towards France. The French artillery, and everything else belonging to them, fell into the hands of the British and Prussians.

Later life

From 1817 to 1824, Adam continued his career in the army. Between 1824 and 1832 he was a popular Lord High Commissioner of the Ionian Islands. His commissioning of the construction of public buildings on Corfu was appreciated by the local population.

From 25 October 1832, to 4 March 1837, he was Governor of Madras and, in 1846, he was promoted to general.

Military commands
Incomplete list of military commands:
 1813 - commanded Anglo-Allied Light Brigade at Biar and Castalla.
 1813 - commanded Anglo-Allied Advanced Guard at Ordal.
 1815 - commanded 3rd (Light) British Brigade at Waterloo.
 1829 - 1835 Colonel of 73rd Perthshire Regiment of Foot.
 1835 - Colonel of 57th Foot who were stationed in India.
 1843 - Colonel 21st Fusiliers.

References

 Keegan, John. The Face of Battle. Vintage, 1977.
 Smith, Digby. The Napoleonic Wars Data Book. Greenhill, 1998.

1780s births
1853 deaths
57th Regiment of Foot officers
73rd Regiment of Foot officers
British Army generals
British Army personnel of the Napoleonic Wars
British Army personnel of the French Revolutionary Wars
Governors of Madras
Knights Grand Cross of the Order of the Bath
Knights Grand Cross of the Order of St Michael and St George
Royal Scots Fusiliers officers
Commanders of the Order of Saints Maurice and Lazarus
Recipients of the Order of St. Anna, 1st class
Recipients of the Waterloo Medal
Knights Cross of the Military Order of Maria Theresa
British people of the Greek War of Independence
Members of the Privy Council of the United Kingdom